Tsacha Lake Airport, formerly , was a registered aerodrome located adjacent to Tsacha Lake, British Columbia, Canada.

References

Defunct airports in British Columbia
Cariboo Regional District